Anthology: A Decade of Hits 1988–1998 is a greatest hits compilation album by Canadian hip hop group Dream Warriors, released June 22, 1999. It was released on Priority Records in the United States. The album featured two new songs, "U Ready" and "dreamwarriors.com". AllMusic gave it 4½ out of 5 stars, calling it "a great look at one of the better hip-hop groups of the '90s."

Track listing

References 

1999 greatest hits albums
Albums produced by DJ Premier
Albums produced by Guru
Compilation albums by Canadian artists
Dream Warriors albums
Hip hop compilation albums
Priority Records compilation albums